Benson Anang (born 1 May 2000) is a Ghanaian professional footballer who currently plays for Žilina in the Fortuna Liga and Ghana and as a defender.

Club career

MŠK Žilina
Anang made his Fortuna Liga debut for Žilina against Nitra on 28 July 2018. Anang completed 90 minutes of the match, playing as a right back. Žilina won the game 2–1.

International career
Anang made his professional debut with the Ghana national team in a friendly 5–0 win over Qatar on 12 October 2020. He completed the entirety of the match.

References

External links
 MŠK Žilina official club profile
 
 Futbalnet profile
 

2000 births
Living people
Ghanaian footballers
Ghana international footballers
Ghanaian expatriate footballers
Association football defenders
MŠK Žilina players
Slovak Super Liga players
Expatriate footballers in Slovakia
Ghanaian expatriate sportspeople in Slovakia
MŠK Žilina Africa players